William Douglass may refer to:

William Douglass (abolitionist) (1804–1862), American abolitionist and church community leader
William Douglass (engineer, born 1831) (1831–1923), engineer-in-chief for Trinity House and later for the Commissioners of Irish Lights
William Douglass (engineer) (1857–1913), Chief Engineer for the Commissioners of Irish Lights
William Douglass (physician) (1691–1752), physician and pamphleteer in Boston
Bill Douglass (1923–1994), American jazz drummer
Klondike Douglass (William Bingham Douglass, 1872–1953), American Major League Baseball player
William Boone Douglass, lawyer, engineer, surveyor and genealogist

See also
William Douglas (disambiguation)